The John Harbach House is a historic house at 303 Ward Street in Newton, Massachusetts. The -story wood-frame house was built c. 1800, and is one of a few surviving Federal style houses in Newton Centre. It is one of three that are associated with the Ward family, who were early settlers of the area. The house has pilastered corners and mitered window moulding strips, and a porch sheltering the front entry that is Colonial Revival in styling. It is currently painted pink with white trim.

The house was listed on the National Register of Historic Places in 1986.

See also
 National Register of Historic Places listings in Newton, Massachusetts

References

Houses on the National Register of Historic Places in Newton, Massachusetts
Federal architecture in Massachusetts
Houses completed in 1800